The nominees for the 2008 Ovation Awards were announced on September 22, 2008.  The awards were presented for excellence in stage productions in the Los Angeles area from September 1, 2007 to August 31, 2008 based upon evaluations from members of the Los Angeles theater community.

The winners were announced on November 17, 2008 in a ceremony hosted by Neil Patrick Harris at the Harriet and Charles Luckman Fine Arts Complex on the campus of California State University, Los Angeles in Los Angeles, California.

Awards 
Winners are listed first and highlighted in boldface.

References 

Ovation Awards
Ovation
2008 in California
2008 awards in the United States
November 2008 events in the United States